Lists of ambassadors of Luxembourg may refer to:

List of ambassadors of Luxembourg to China
List of ambassadors of Luxembourg to India
List of ambassadors of Luxembourg to the Czech Republic
List of ambassadors of Luxembourg to the United States